The coat of arms of Antigua and Barbuda was designed in 1966 by Gordon Christopher. It was officially introduced on 16 February 1967. The symbolism of the arms is more complex than that found on the flag of Antigua and Barbuda, but many elements are similar.

At the top of the coat of arms is a pineapple, a fruit for which the islands are famous. There are several plants found around the shield, all abundant in the country: red hibiscus, sugarcane, and century plant (Agave americana). Supporting the shield is a pair of deer representing the wildlife of the islands.

The design on the shield shows the sun, also found on the flag, rising from a blue and white sea. The sun symbolises a new beginning, and the black background represents the African origins of many of the nation's citizens. At the bottom of the shield, in front of the sea, sits a stylised sugar mill. The sun on the shield represents the six parishes of Antigua, and, the island of Barbuda.

At the bottom is a scroll upon which is written the national motto: "Each endeavouring, all achieving".

References

External links
  Coat of arms of Antigua and Barbuda In The World All Countries Coat of arms

National symbols of Antigua and Barbuda
Antigua and Barbuda
Antigua and Barbuda
Antigua and Barbuda
Antigua and Barbuda
Antigua and Barbuda
Antigua and Barbuda
Symbols introduced in 1967